Buxtorf is a surname. Notable people with the surname include:

 Johannes Buxtorf (1564–1629), German theologian
 Johannes Buxtorf II (1599–1664), Swiss theologian, son of Johannes
 Johannes Jakob Buxtorf (1645–1705), Swiss Hebraist, son of Johannes II